National Judicial Council may refer to:

 National Judicial Council (Croatia)
 National Judicial Council (Nigeria)

See also 
 Council of the judiciary
 Judicial Council (disambiguation)
 Judiciary committee (disambiguation)